In 1997, Hollywood Records released a greatest-hits album by the Party, but it was soon overshadowed by the success of other former Mouseketeers such as Britney Spears, Christina Aguilera, and Justin Timberlake & JC Chasez of *NSYNC. Oddly, this album featured instrumental-only versions of the first four songs.

Track listing
That's Why (No main vocals) (Stephen Bray, Linda Mallah)
I Found Love (No main vocals)
Summer Vacation (No main vocals)
Sugar Is Sweet (No main vocals) (Billy Steinberg, Tom Kelly)
In My Dreams  (Don Dokken, George Lynch, Jeff Pilson)
Peace, Love, and Understanding  (Nick Lowe)
My Generation
I Know What Boys Like (Christopher Butler, Merovigian)
Free (Teddy Riley, Lavaba Mallison, Jerrold Holmes)
All About Love
Change on Me
Where is My Romeo
Let's Get Right Down to It
I Wish You Peace

1997 greatest hits albums
The Party (band) albums
Hollywood Records compilation albums